Turky may be:

 an obsolete spelling of "Turkey", the country
 a given name and surname:
 Salim Turky, Tanzanian politician
 Turky Al-Thagafi, Saudi Arabian footballer

See also 

 Turkiye (disambiguation)
 Turkey (disambiguation)
 Turke (disambiguation)
 Turki (disambiguation)